Keran is a village and tourist resort in Neelum Valley, Azad Kashmir, Pakistan. The adjacent village on the other side of the Neelum river in Indian Kashmir is also known as Keran.

Keran is accessible by Neelam valley road, and is located 93 km from Muzaffarabad.

See also
Dosut
Athmuqam
Sharda
Kel
Arang Kel
Taobat

References

Populated places in Neelam District
Hill stations in Pakistan
2005 Kashmir earthquake
Tourist attractions in Azad Kashmir